Dallasiellus is a genus of burrowing bugs in the family Cydnidae. There are about 18 described species in Dallasiellus.

Species
These 18 species belong to the genus Dallasiellus:

 Dallasiellus americanus g
 Dallasiellus californicus (Blatchley, 1929) i c g
 Dallasiellus discrepans (Uhler, 1877) i c g
 Dallasiellus foratus g
 Dallasiellus horvathi g
 Dallasiellus interruptus g
 Dallasiellus leurus g
 Dallasiellus levipennis g
 Dallasiellus longirostris g
 Dallasiellus longulus (Dallas, 1851) i c g
 Dallasiellus lugubris (Stål, 1860) i c g b
 Dallasiellus megalocephalus Froeschner, 1960 g
 Dallasiellus planicollis g
 Dallasiellus puncticeps g
 Dallasiellus puncticoria Froeschner, 1960 i c g
 Dallasiellus solitaria g
 Dallasiellus varaderensis   Marrero & Martinez, 2014 
 Dallasiellus vanduzeei Froeschner, 1960 i c g
 Dallasiellus viduus g

Data sources: i = ITIS, c = Catalogue of Life, g = GBIF, b = Bugguide.net

References

Further reading

 
 

Cydnidae
Articles created by Qbugbot